WCXE-LP (95.5 FM) is an American low-power FM radio station licensed to serve the community of Erlanger, Kentucky. The station is currently owned by SGM, Inc.

References

External links
 

CXE-LP
CXE-LP
Classic rock radio stations in the United States
CXE-LP